Yutog Yontan Gonpo (traditionally 708 – 833) was an 8th-century high lama and a physician of Tibet.

He should be distinguished from Yuthok Yontan Gompo the Younger who lived in the 12th century. For further discussion see Portrait of Yutog Yontan Gonpo.

References

External links
 Yuthok Yontan Gompo the Younger
Tibetan Medicine Education cente
Tibetan Medical & Astrology Institute of the Dalai Lama
Tibetanmedicine.com
International Academy for Traditional Tibetan Medicine (IATTM)

Lamas
Lamas from Tibet
Tibetan Buddhists
Traditional Tibetan medicine practitioners
8th-century Tibetan people
8th-century physicians
Longevity myths

Year of birth uncertain
833 deaths